Bespoke shoes or custom shoes are shoes made especially for a certain customer by a shoemaker. The feet are measured and a last for each foot is created.  At the fitting, the customer tries the prototype pair of shoes made in an inexpensive leather and the shoemaker checks if anything needs to be changed. If so, the changes are applied to the lasts and the shoes are created with a precious leather. After the final lasts are created, the customer can order more pairs of shoes without more measurements and fittings.

Producers
Producers of bespoke shoes may include:
Amedeo Testoni
Antonio Meccariello
Berluti
Bontoni
Corthay
Edward Green
Ferrante 1875
George Cleverly
Gaziano & Girling
Hiro Yanagimachi
John Lobb
James Taylor & Son
Masaru Okuyama
Meticulous Men
Milly J Shoes
Noriyuki Misawa
Riccardo Bestetti
Santoni
Silvano Lattanz
Stefano Bemer
Vass Shoes
Veritas Bespoke
Yohei Fukuda
Jan P. Myhre

See also
Bespoke
Bespoke tailoring

References

Shoemaking
Shoes